Cranwell is a village in the North Kesteven district of Lincolnshire, England. The principal through road, the B1429 between the A15 to the east and the A17 to the west, joins the village to RAF Cranwell. The appropriate civil parish is called Cranwell, Brauncewell and Byard's Leap with a population of 2,827 at the 2011 census.

History
During the medieval period the parish was originally governed as part of  the ancient Flaxwell Wapentake in the North Kesteven division of  Lincolnshire. The name Cranwell is thought to mean the spring or stream frequented by cranes or herons.

The village centres on the remains of the village cross. The cross is a 14th-century market cross (or buttercross) from which important matters of public moment were announced. The cross, which is listed as a scheduled monument, had restoration work carried out by a Mr CH Fowler between 1903 and 1904.

Cranwell manor was held by the Thorold family from the 16th century for over three hundred years. The manor house was demolished in 1816 and the Hall Farm's farmhouse was erected on the site. The Thorold family moved to a new mansion at Syston Park. In 1871 Sir John Thorold is recorded as owning all the land in Cranwell with the exception of the church glebelands and a single farmstead that was under the ownership of St John's College, Cambridge.
 
In 1682, Sir William and his wife Lady Anne Thorold are recorded as establishing a charity that gave about £8 and 2 shillings (£8.10) per year for the poor, to be distributed on Lady Day (25 March and then considered to be New Year's Day). The parish also benefited from the will of Lady Margaret Thorold who granted £15 a year to apprentice four boys from the village. With the Poor Law Amendment Act reforms of 1834, the parish became part of the Sleaford Poor Law Union group of parishes.

The population of the village in 1801 was recorded as being just 88 people and even by 1911 had only risen to 184. The village only grew and has continued to expand since the opening of the aviation training facility and now stands in the region of 3,000 residents.

Cranwell railway station, on a single track branch line from Sleaford, opened in 1917 and served the naval aviation training facility then known as RNAS Daedalus, later to become RAF Cranwell. The branch line was closed in 1956 and the track removed. However, the original station building still stands and is in use as the current RAF main guardroom. Engine sheds in a small goods yard area closer to the village were demolished and the land re-used for housing.

Religious sites
Standing near to the cross is the village's parish church. Dedicated to St Andrew, the church originates circa the 10th century, the village possibly dates from the time of King Alfred (849-899). The church consists only of a nave and chancel with, above the former, a bellcote, much of the masonry is Norman but parts date back to Saxon times. The fittings include 17th century bench-ends and a Perpendicular rood screen.
 
Mounted on corbels in the north aisle are the remains of a hogsback grave. The carvings on these stones are either Saxon or Norse (Ringerike). The stones are unique to Lincolnshire and are probably the finest of their type in the country. In the stonework in the porch is the incised outline of a pilgrim's shoe and the year 1728, and on the right-hand door pillar are six carved figures believed to depict ancient May King and Queen ceremonial costumes. The churchyard includes a Commonwealth War Graves Commission cemetery with 131 graves from First and Second World Wars.

Education
As early as 1682, Sir William and Lady Anne Thorold funded a charity that provided £3 each year for the education of poor children from within the parish. The first true school built in Cranwell opened in 1850 by public subscription and provided facilities for up to 35 children.

The current Cranwell Primary School is housed in a modern building and has approximately 300 children on the roll between the ages of 4 - 11. The school is a Foundation school and is non-denominational.

There are no secondary schools in the village and children instead travel to Lincoln, Grantham or Sleaford.

RAF College Cranwell

Just over one mile to the west of the village is Royal Air Force College Cranwell, and RAF Cranwell with its two associated airfields. The northern airfield is the older, being used for light aircraft and airships from 1916 and remains as a grassed field used regularly by gliders and light aircraft. The southern airfield is much larger with two paved runways and abuts the A17 road, this was first used as a flying training base in 1917. The paved runways were built in 1954, to make way for the jet aircraft, Meteor and Vampire.

Cranwell does not have a public house. It does, however, have a members only social club. This dates back to when the cadets training at RAF Cranwell during the Second World War used to come into the village to try and buy alcohol. The members only club was introduced as a deterrent to them, being only temporary residents in the area they were therefore unable to gain membership. To this day, no pub has ever opened its doors to the public, even though the reasons for not having one have long since become obsolete.

Other uses of the name Cranwell
The surname Cranwell occurs in Buckinghamshire and Essex (at least), it appears in the Domesday Book. A few very small farms and hamlets are named Cranwell in Bucks.

References

External links

RAF Cranwell Home Page

"Cranwell", Genuki.org.uk. Retrieved 20 July 2011

Villages in Lincolnshire
North Kesteven District